Monica Seles was the defending champion and won in the final 6–2, 6–4 against Anke Huber.

Seeds
A champion seed is indicated in bold text while text in italics indicates the round in which that seed was eliminated. The top eight seeds received a bye to the second round.

  Monica Seles (champion)
  Iva Majoli (second round)
  Amanda Coetzer (quarterfinals)
  Lindsay Davenport (quarterfinals)
  Arantxa Sánchez Vicario (third round)
  Mary Pierce (third round)
  Conchita Martínez (semifinals)
  Anke Huber (final)
  Irina Spîrlea (first round)
  Mary Joe Fernández (semifinals)
  Kimberly Po (third round)
  Brenda Schultz-McCarthy (first round)
  Ruxandra Dragomir (first round)
  Karina Habšudová (first round)
  Sandrine Testud (third round)
  Sabine Appelmans (third round)

Draw

Finals

Top half

Section 1

Section 2

Bottom half

Section 3

Section 4

References
 1997 du Maurier Open Draw

Singles
1997 du Maurier Open